The Controlled Substances Act (CSA) is the statute establishing federal U.S. drug policy under which the manufacture, importation, possession, use, and distribution of certain substances is regulated. It was passed by the 91st United States Congress as Title II of the Comprehensive Drug Abuse Prevention and Control Act of 1970 and signed into law by President Richard Nixon. The Act also served as the national implementing legislation for the Single Convention on Narcotic Drugs.

The legislation created five schedules (classifications), with varying qualifications for a substance to be included in each. Two federal agencies, the Drug Enforcement Administration (DEA) and the Food and Drug Administration (FDA), determine which substances are added to or removed from the various schedules, although the statute passed by Congress created the initial listing. Congress has sometimes scheduled other substances through legislation such as the Hillory J. Farias and Samantha Reid Date-Rape Prevention Act of 2000, which placed gamma hydroxybutyrate (GHB) in Schedule I and sodium oxybate (the isolated sodium salt in GHB) in Schedule III when used under an FDA NDA or IND. Classification decisions are required to be made on criteria including potential for abuse (an undefined term), currently accepted medical use in treatment in the United States, and international treaties.

History

The nation first outlawed addictive drugs in the early 1900s and the International Opium Convention helped lead international agreements regulating trade. The Food and Drugs Act of 1906 was the beginning of over 200 laws concerning public health and consumer protections. Others were the Federal Food, Drug, and Cosmetic Act (1938), and the Kefauver Harris Amendment of 1962.

In 1969, President Richard Nixon announced that the Attorney General, John N. Mitchell, was preparing a comprehensive new measure to more effectively meet the narcotic and dangerous drug problems at the federal level by combining all existing federal laws into a single new statute. With the help of White House Counsel head, John Dean; the Executive Director of the Shafer Commission, Michael Sonnenreich; and the Director of the BNDD, John Ingersoll creating and writing the legislation, Mitchell was able to present Nixon with the bill.

The CSA not only combined existing federal drug laws and expanded their scope, but it also changed the nature of federal drug law policies and expanded federal law enforcement pertaining to controlled substances.
Title II, Part F of the Comprehensive Drug Abuse Prevention and Control Act of 1970 established the National Commission on Marijuana and Drug Abuse—known as the Shafer Commission after its chairman, Raymond P. Shafer—to study cannabis abuse in the United States. During his presentation of the commission's First Report to Congress, Sonnenreich and Shafer recommended the decriminalization of marijuana in small amounts, with Shafer stating,

Rufus King notes that this stratagem was similar to that used by Harry Anslinger when he consolidated the previous anti-drug treaties into the Single Convention and took the opportunity to add new provisions that otherwise might have been unpalatable to the international community. According to David T. Courtwright, "the Act was part of an omnibus reform package designed to rationalize, and in some respects to liberalize, American drug policy." (Courtwright noted that the Act became, not libertarian, but instead repressionistic to the point of tyrannical, in its intent.) It eliminated mandatory minimum sentences and provided support for drug treatment and research. 

King notes that the rehabilitation clauses were added as a compromise to Senator Jim Hughes, who favored a moderate approach. The bill, as introduced by Senator Everett Dirksen, ran to 91 pages. While it was being drafted, the Uniform Controlled Substances Act, to be passed by state legislatures, was also being drafted by the Department of Justice; its wording closely mirrored the Controlled Substances Act.

Amendments, 1970–2018
Since its enactment in 1970, the Act has been amended numerous times:
The 1976 Medical Device Regulation Act.
The Psychotropic Substances Act of 1978 added provisions implementing the Convention on Psychotropic Substances.
The Controlled Substances Penalties Amendments Act of 1984.
The 1986 Federal Analog Act for chemicals "substantially similar" in Schedule I and II to be listed
The 1988 Chemical Diversion and Trafficking Act (implemented August 1, 1989 as Article 12) added provisions implementing the United Nations Convention Against Illicit Traffic in Narcotic Drugs and Psychotropic Substances that went into force on November 11, 1990.
1990 The Anabolic Steroids Act, passed as part of the Crime Control Act of 1990, which placed anabolic steroids into Schedule III
The 1993 Domestic Chemical Diversion and Control Act (effective on April 16, 1994) in response to methamphetamine trafficking.
The Hillory J. Farias and Samantha Reid Date-Rape Prevention Act of 2000 placed gamma hydroxybutyrate (GHB) in Schedule I and sodium oxybate (the isolated sodium salt in GHB) in Schedule III when used under an FDA NDA or IND.
The 2008 Ryan Haight Online Pharmacy Consumer Protection Act
The 2010 Electronic Prescriptions for Controlled Substances (EPCS) .
The 2012 Synthetic Drug Abuse Prevention Act Subtitle D - synthetic drugs,  added several Markush like statements that describes synthetic cannabinoid chemical space that are also controlled as Schedule 1 substances. However since then many new synthetic cannabinoids not covered by this act have emerged
The 2010 Secure and Responsible Drug Disposal Act (effective on October 12, 2010), to allow pharmacies to operate take-back programs for controlled substance medications in response to the US opioid epidemic.
The 2017 Protecting Patient Access to Emergency Medications Act (PPAEMA) amended Section 33 of the CSA to include DEA registration for Emergency Medical Service (EMS) agencies, approved uses of standing orders, and requirements for the maintenance and administration of controlled substances used by EMS agencies.
In 2018 the act was also amended to describe and control all chemical space related to Fentanyl like chemicals using Markush like notation, the first time Markush like statement were directly used in the act itself

Content
The Controlled Substances Act consists of two subchapters. Subchapter I defines Schedules I–V, lists chemicals used in the manufacture of controlled substances, and differentiates lawful and unlawful manufacturing, distribution, and possession of controlled substances, including possession of Schedule I drugs for personal use; this subchapter also specifies the dollar amounts of fines and durations of prison terms for violations. Subchapter II describes the laws for exportation and importation of controlled substances, again specifying fines and prison terms for violations.

Enforcement authority

The Drug Enforcement Administration was established in 1973, combining the Bureau of Narcotics and Dangerous Drugs (BNDD) and Customs' drug agents. Proceedings to add, delete, or change the schedule of a drug or other substance may be initiated by the DEA, the Department of Health and Human Services (HHS), or by petition from any interested party, including the manufacturer of a drug, a medical society or association, a pharmacy association, a public interest group concerned with drug abuse, a state or local government agency, or an individual citizen. When a petition is received by the DEA, the agency begins its own investigation of the drug.

The DEA may begin an investigation of a drug at any time based upon information received from laboratories, state and local law enforcement and regulatory agencies, or other sources of information. Once the DEA has collected the necessary data, the Deputy Administrator of DEA, requests from HHS a scientific and medical evaluation and recommendation as to whether the drug or other substance should be controlled or removed from control. 

This request is sent to the Assistant Secretary of Health of HHS. Then, HHS solicits information from the Commissioner of the Food and Drug Administration and evaluations and recommendations from the National Institute on Drug Abuse and, on occasion, from the scientific and medical community at large. The Assistant Secretary, by authority of the Secretary, compiles the information and transmits back to the DEA a medical and scientific evaluation regarding the drug or other substance, a recommendation as to whether the drug should be controlled, and in what schedule it should be placed.

The HHS recommendation on scheduling is binding to the extent that if HHS recommends, based on its medical and scientific evaluation, that the substance not be controlled, then the DEA may not control the substance. Once the DEA has received the scientific and medical evaluation from HHS, the DEA Administrator evaluates all available data and makes a final decision whether to propose that a drug or other substance be controlled and into which schedule it should be placed. Under certain circumstances, the Government may temporarily schedule a drug without following the normal procedure. 

An example is when international treaties require control of a substance.  allows the Attorney General to temporarily place a substance in Schedule I "to avoid an imminent hazard to the public safety". Thirty days' notice is required before the order can be issued, and the scheduling expires after a year. The period may be extended six months if rulemaking proceedings to permanently schedule the drug are in progress. In any case, once these proceedings are complete, the temporary order is automatically vacated. Unlike ordinary scheduling proceedings, such temporary orders are not subject to judicial review.

The CSA creates a closed system of distribution for those authorized to handle controlled substances. The cornerstone of this system is the registration of all those authorized by the DEA to handle controlled substances. All individuals and firms that are registered are required to maintain complete and accurate inventories and records of all transactions involving controlled substances, as well as security for the storage of controlled substances.

Treaty obligations
The CSA bears many resemblances to these Conventions. Both the CSA and the treaties set out a system for classifying controlled substances in several schedules in accordance with the binding scientific and medical findings of a public health authority. Under  of the CSA, that authority is the Secretary of Health and Human Services (HHS). Under Article 3 of the Single Convention and Article 2 of the Convention on Psychotropic Substances, the World Health Organization is that authority.

The domestic and international legal nature of these treaty obligations must be considered in light of the supremacy of the United States Constitution over treaties or acts and the equality of treaties and Congressional acts. In Reid v. Covert the Supreme Court of the United States addressed both these issues directly and clearly holding:

According to the Cato Institute, these treaties only bind (legally obligate) the United States to comply with them as long as that nation agrees to remain a state party to these treaties. The U.S. Congress and the President of the United States have the absolute sovereign right to withdraw from or abrogate at any time these two instruments, in accordance with said nation's Constitution, at which point these treaties will cease to bind that nation in any way, shape, or form.

If control of a substance is mandated by the Single Convention, the Attorney General is required to "issue an order controlling such drug under the schedule he deems most appropriate to carry out such obligations," without regard to the normal scheduling procedure or the findings of the HHS Secretary. However, the Secretary has great influence over any drug scheduling proposal under the Single Convention, because  requires the Secretary the power to "evaluate the proposal and furnish a recommendation to the Secretary of State which shall be binding on the representative of the United States in discussions and negotiations relating to the proposal."

Similarly, if the United Nations Commission on Narcotic Drugs adds or transfers a substance to a schedule established by the Convention on Psychotropic Substances, so that current U.S. regulations on the drug do not meet the treaty's requirements, the Secretary is required to issue a recommendation on how the substance should be scheduled under the CSA. If the Secretary agrees with the Commission's scheduling decision, he can recommend that the Attorney General initiate proceedings to reschedule the drug accordingly. 

If the HHS Secretary disagrees with the UN controls, the Attorney General must temporarily place the drug in Schedule IV or V (whichever meets the minimum requirements of the treaty) and exclude the substance from any regulations not mandated by the treaty. The Secretary is required to request that the Secretary of State take action, through the Commission or the UN Economic and Social Council, to remove the drug from international control or transfer it to a different schedule under the Convention. The temporary scheduling expires as soon as control is no longer needed to meet international treaty obligations.

This provision was invoked in 1984 to place Rohypnol (flunitrazepam) in Schedule IV. The drug did not then meet the Controlled Substances Act's criteria for scheduling; however, control was required by the Convention on Psychotropic Substances. In 1999, an FDA official explained to Congress:

The Cato Institute's Handbook for Congress calls for repealing the CSA, an action that would likely bring the United States into conflict with international law, were the United States not to exercise its sovereign right to withdraw from and/or abrogate the Single Convention on Narcotic Drugs and/or the 1971 Convention on Psychotropic Substances prior to repealing the Controlled Substances Act. The exception would be if the U.S. were to claim that the treaty obligations violate the United States Constitution. Many articles in these treaties—such as Article 35 and Article 36 of the Single Convention—are prefaced with phrases such as "Having due regard to their constitutional, legal and administrative systems, the Parties shall . . ." or "Subject to its constitutional limitations, each Party shall . . ." According to former United Nations Drug Control Programme Chief of Demand Reduction Cindy Fazey, "This has been used by the USA not to implement part of article 3 of the 1988 Convention, which prevents inciting others to use narcotic or psychotropic drugs, on the basis that this would be in contravention of their constitutional amendment guaranteeing freedom of speech".

Schedules of controlled substances
There are five different schedules of controlled substances, numbered IV.  The CSA describes the different schedules based on three factors:

 Potential for abuse: How likely is this drug to be abused?
 Accepted medical use: Is this drug used as a treatment in the United States?
 Safety and potential for addiction: Is this drug safe? How likely is this drug to cause addiction? What kinds of addiction?

The following table gives a summary of the different schedules.

Every schedule otherwise requires finding and specifying the "potential for abuse" before a substance can be placed in that schedule. The specific classification of any given drug or other substance is usually a source of controversy, as is the purpose and effectiveness of the entire regulatory scheme.

Some have argued that this is an important exemption, since alcohol and tobacco are two of the most widely used drugs in the United States.

Schedule I controlled substances

Schedule I substances are described as those that have all of the following findings:

No prescriptions may be written for Schedule I substances, and such substances are subject to production quotas which the DEA imposes.

Under the DEA's interpretation of the CSA, a drug does not necessarily have to have the same "high potential for abuse" as heroin, for example, to merit placement in Schedule I:

Drugs listed in this control schedule include:

 αMT (alpha-methyltryptamine), a psychedelic, stimulant, and entactogen drug of the tryptamine class that was originally developed as an antidepressant by workers at Upjohn in the 1960s.
 BZP (benzylpiperazine), a synthetic stimulant once sold as a designer drug. It has been shown to be associated with an increase in seizures if taken alone. Although the effects of BZP are not as potent as MDMA, it can produce neuroadaptations that can cause an increase in the potential for abuse of this drug.
 Cathinone, an amphetamine-like stimulant found in the shrub Catha edulis (khat).
 DMT (dimethyltryptamine), a naturally occurring psychedelic drug that is widespread throughout the plant kingdom and endogenous to the human body. DMT is the main psychoactive constituent in the psychedelic South American brew, ayahuasca, for which the UDV are granted exemption from DMT's schedule I status on the grounds of religious freedom.
 Etorphine, a semi-synthetic opioid possessing an analgesic potency approximately 1,000–3,000 times that of morphine.
 GHB (gamma-Hydroxybutyric acid), a general anesthetic and treatment for narcolepsy-cataplexy and alcohol withdrawal with a limited safe dosage range and poor ability to control pain when used as an anesthetic (severely limiting its usefulness). It was placed in Schedule I in March 2000 after widespread recreational use led to increased emergency room visits, hospitalizations, and deaths. A specific formulation of this drug is also listed in Schedule III for limited uses, under the trademark Xyrem.
 Heroin, is the brand name for diacetylmorphine or morphine diacetate, which is an inactive prodrug that exerts its effects after being converted into the major active metabolite morphine, and the minor metabolite 6-MAM - which itself is also rapidly converted to morphine. Some European countries still use it as a potent pain reliever in terminal cancer patients, and as second option, after morphine sulfate; it is about twice as potent, by weight, as morphine and, indeed, becomes morphine upon injection into the bloodstream. The two acetyl groups attached to the morphine make a prodrug which delivers morphine to the opioid receptors twice as fast as morphine can.
 Ibogaine, a naturally occurring psychoactive substance found in plants in the family Apocynaceae. Some countries in North America use ibogaine as an alternative medicine treatment for opioid drug addiction. Ibogaine is also used for medicinal and ritual purposes within African spiritual traditions of the Bwiti.
 LSD (lysergic acid diethylamide), a semi-synthetic psychedelic drug famous for its involvement in the counterculture of the 1960s.
 Marijuana and its cannabinoids. Pure (–)-trans-Δ9-tetrahydrocannabinol is also listed in Schedule III for limited uses, under the trademark Marinol.  Many states have made recreational and medical use of marijuana legal, while other states have decriminalized possession of small amounts. Such measures operate only on state laws, and have no effect on Federal law. Whether such users would actually be prosecuted under federal law is a separate question with no definitive answer.
 MDMA ("ecstasy" or "molly"), a stimulant, psychedelic, and entactogenic drug which initially garnered attention in psychedelic therapy as a treatment for post-traumatic stress disorder (PTSD). The medical community originally agreed upon placing it as a Schedule III substance, but the government denied this suggestion, despite two court rulings by the DEA's administrative law judge that placing MDMA in Schedule I was illegal. It was temporarily unscheduled after the first administrative hearing from December 22, 1987 – July 1, 1988.
 Mescaline, a naturally occurring psychedelic drug and the main psychoactive constituent of peyote (Lophophora williamsii), San Pedro cactus (Echinopsis pachanoi), and Peruvian torch cactus (Echinopsis peruviana).
 Methaqualone (Quaalude, Sopor, Mandrax), a sedative that was previously used for similar purposes as barbiturates, until it was rescheduled.
 Peyote (Lophophora williamsii), a cactus growing in nature primarily in northeastern Mexico; one of the few plants specifically scheduled, with a narrow exception to its legal status for religious use in Native American churches.
 Psilocybin and psilocin, naturally occurring psychedelic drugs and the main psychoactive constituents of psilocybin mushrooms. 
 Controlled substance analogues intended for human consumption, as defined by the Federal Analogue Act.
In addition to the named substance, usually all possible ethers, esters, salts and stereo isomers of these substances are also controlled and also 'analogues', which are chemically similar chemicals.

Schedule II controlled substances

Schedule II substances are those that have the following findings:

Except when dispensed directly to an ultimate user by a practitioner other than a pharmacist, no controlled substance in Schedule II, which is a prescription drug as determined under the Federal Food, Drug, and Cosmetic Act (21 USC 301 et seq.), may be dispensed without the written or electronically transmitted (21 CFR 1306.08) prescription of a practitioner, except that in emergency situations, as prescribed by the Secretary by regulation after consultation with the Attorney General, such drug may be dispensed upon oral prescription in accordance with section 503(b) of that Act (21 USC 353 (b)). With exceptions, an original prescription is always required even though faxing in a prescription in advance to a pharmacy by a prescriber is allowed. 

Prescriptions shall be retained in conformity with the requirements of section 827 of this title. No prescription for a controlled substance in Schedule II may be refilled. Notably no emergency situation provisions exist outside the Controlled Substances Act's "closed system" although this closed system may be unavailable or nonfunctioning in the event of accidents in remote areas or disasters such as hurricanes and earthquakes. Acts which would widely be considered morally imperative remain offenses subject to heavy penalties.

These drugs vary in potency: for example fentanyl is about 80 times as potent as morphine (heroin is roughly two times as potent). More significantly, they vary in nature. Pharmacology and CSA scheduling have a weak relationship.

Because refills of prescriptions for Schedule II substances are not allowed, it can be burdensome to both the practitioner and the patient if the substances are to be used on a long-term basis. To provide relief, in 2007,  was amended (at ) to allow practitioners to write up to three prescriptions at once, to provide up to a 90-day supply, specifying on each the earliest date on which it may be filled.

Drugs in this schedule include:
 Amphetamine drugs including Adderall, Dextroamphetamine (Dexedrine), Lisdexamfetamine (Vyvanse): treatment of ADHD, narcolepsy, severe obesity (limited use, dextroamphetamine only), binge eating disorder (lisdexamfetamine only). Originally placed in Schedule III, but moved to Schedule II in 1978 as part of the Psychotropic Substances Act.
 Barbiturates (short-acting), such as pentobarbital
 Cocaine: used as a topical anesthetic or local anesthetic and to stop severe epistaxis
 Codeine (pure) and any drug for non-parenteral administration containing the equivalent of more than 90 mg of codeine per dosage unit;
 Diphenoxylate (pure)
 Fentanyl and most other strong pure opioid agonists, e.g. levorphanol
 Hydrocodone in any formulation since October 2014 (examples include Vicodin, Norco, Tussionex). Prior to October 2014, formulations containing hydrocodone and over-the-counter analgesics such as Acetaminophen and Ibuprofen were Schedule III.
 Hydromorphone (semi-synthetic opioid; active ingredient in Dilaudid, Palladone)
 Methadone: treatment of heroin addiction, extreme chronic pain
 Methamphetamine: treatment of ADHD (rare), severe obesity (limited use) under the brandname Desoxyn.
 Methylphenidate (Ritalin, Concerta), Dexmethylphenidate (Focalin): treatment of ADHD, narcolepsy
 Morphine: a pain medication of the opiate family.
 Nabilone (Cesamet) – A synthetic cannabinoid. An analogue to dronabinol (Marinol) which is a Schedule III drug.
 Opium tincture (Laudanum): a potent antidiarrheal
 Oxycodone (semi-synthetic opioid; active ingredient in Percocet, OxyContin, and Percodan)
 Oxymorphone (semi-synthetic opioid; active ingredient in Opana)
 Nembutal (Pentobarbital) – barbiturate medication originally developed for narcolepsy; primarily used today for physician assisted suicide and euthanasia of animals.
 Pethidine (USAN: Meperidine; Demerol)
 Phencyclidine (PCP) - Used as veterinary anesthetic under the trade name Sernylan
 Secobarbital (Seconal)
 Tapentadol (Nucynta) – A drug with mixed opioid agonist and norepinephrine re-uptake inhibitor activity.

Schedule III controlled substances

Schedule III substances are those that have the following findings:

Except when dispensed directly by a practitioner, other than a pharmacist, to an ultimate user, no controlled substance in Schedule III or IV, which is a prescription drug as determined under the Federal Food, Drug, and Cosmetic Act (21 USC 301 et seq.), may be dispensed without a written, electronically transmitted, or oral prescription in conformity with section 503(b) of that Act (21 USC 353 (b)). Such prescriptions may not be filled or refilled more than six months after the date thereof or be refilled more than five times after the date of the prescription unless renewed by the practitioner. 

A prescription for controlled substances in Schedules III, IV, and V issued by a practitioner, may be communicated either orally, in writing, electronically transmitted or by facsimile to the pharmacist, and may be refilled if so authorized on the prescription or by call-in. Control of wholesale distribution is somewhat less stringent than Schedule II drugs. Provisions for emergency situations are less restrictive within the "closed system" of the Controlled Substances Act than for Schedule II though no schedule has provisions to address circumstances where the closed system is unavailable, nonfunctioning or otherwise inadequate.

Drugs in this schedule include:

 Ketamine, a drug originally developed as a safer, shorter-acting replacement for PCP (mainly for use as a human anesthetic) but has since become popular as a veterinary and pediatric anesthetic;
 Anabolic steroids (including prohormones such as androstenedione); the specific end molecule testosterone in many of its forms (Androderm, AndroGel, Testosterone Cypionate, and Testosterone Enanthate) are labeled as Schedule III while low-dose testosterone when compounded with estrogen derivatives have been exempted (from scheduling) by the FDA
 Intermediate-acting barbiturates, such as talbutal or butalbital
 Buprenorphine (semi-synthetic opioid; active in Suboxone, Subutex)
 Dihydrocodeine when compounded with other substances, to a certain dosage and concentration.
 Xyrem Sodium Oxybate, a preparation of GHB used to treat narcolepsy. Xyrem is in Schedule III but with a restricted distribution system. All other forms or preparations of GHB are in Schedule I.
 Marinol, synthetically prepared tetrahydrocannabinol (officially referred to by its INN, dronabinol) used to treat nausea and vomiting caused by chemotherapy, as well as appetite loss caused by AIDS.
 Paregoric, an antidiarrheal and anti-tussive, which contains opium combined with camphor (which makes it less addiction-prone than laudanum, which is in Schedule II).
 Phendimetrazine Tartrate, a stimulant synthesized for use as an anorexiant.
 Benzphetamine HCl (Didrex), a stimulant designed for use as an anorexiant.
 Fast-acting barbiturates such as secobarbital (Seconal) and pentobarbital (Nembutal), when combined with one or more additional active ingredient(s) not in Schedule II (e.g., Carbrital (no longer marketed), a combination of pentobarbital and carbromal).
 Ergine (lysergic acid amide), listed as a sedative but also has psychedelic effects such as visual and auditory effects. An inefficient precursor to its N,N-diethyl analogue, LSD, ergine occurs naturally in the seeds of the common garden flowers Turbina corymbosa, Ipomoea tricolor, and Argyreia nervosa.
 Perampanel (Fycompa), an anticonvulsant

Schedule IV controlled substances

Placement on schedules; findings required
Schedule IV substances are those that have the following findings:

Control measures are similar to Schedule III. Prescriptions for Schedule IV drugs may be refilled up to five times within a six-month period. A prescription for controlled substances in Schedules III, IV, and V issued by a practitioner, may be communicated either orally, in writing, electronically transmitted or by facsimile to the pharmacist, and may be refilled if so authorized on the prescription or by call-in.

Drugs in this schedule include:

 Benzodiazepines, such as alprazolam (Xanax), chlordiazepoxide (Librium), clonazepam (Klonopin), diazepam (Valium), midazolam (Versed), and Lorazepam (Ativan), as well as:
temazepam (Restoril) (some states require specially coded prescriptions for temazepam)
 flunitrazepam (Rohypnol) (flunitrazepam is not FDA approved making it an illegal drug in the United States)
oxazepam (Serax, Serepax, Seresta, Alepam, Opamox, Oxamin)
 The benzodiazepine-like Z-drugs: zolpidem (Ambien), zopiclone (Imovane), eszopiclone (Lunesta), and zaleplon (Sonata) (zopiclone is not commercially available in the U.S.)
 Chloral hydrate, a sedative-hypnotic
 Long-acting barbiturates such as phenobarbital
 Some partial agonist opioid analgesics, such as pentazocine (Talwin)
 The eugeroic drug modafinil (sold in the U.S. as Provigil) as well as its (R)-enantiomer armodafinil (sold in the U.S. as Nuvigil)
 Difenoxin, an antidiarrheal drug, when combined with atropine (such as Motofen) (difenoxin is 2–3 times more potent than diphenoxylate, the active ingredient in Lomotil, which is in Schedule V)
 Tramadol (Ultram), an opioid analgesic 
  Carisoprodol (Soma) has become a Schedule IV medication as of 11 January 2012
 Suvorexant and Lemborexant, orexinergic sedatives

Schedule V controlled substances

Schedule V substances are those that have the following findings:

No controlled substance in Schedule V which is a drug may be distributed or dispensed other than for a medical purpose. A prescription for controlled substances in Schedules III, IV, and V issued by a practitioner, may be communicated either orally, in writing, electronically transmitted or by facsimile to the pharmacist, and may be refilled if so authorized on the prescription or by call-in.

Drugs in this schedule include:
 Cough suppressants containing small amounts of codeine (e.g., promethazine+codeine);
 Preparations containing small amounts of opium or diphenoxylate (used to treat diarrhea);
 Some anticonvulsants, such as pregabalin (Lyrica), lacosamide (Vimpat) and retigabine (ezogabine) (Potiga/Trobalt);
 Pyrovalerone (used to treat chronic fatigue and as an appetite suppressant for weight loss);
 Some centrally-acting antidiarrheals, such as diphenoxylate (Lomotil) when mixed with atropine (to make it poisonous, if taken at euphoria-inducing dosages). Difenoxin with atropine (Motofen) has been moved to Schedule IV. Without atropine, these drugs are in Schedule II.
 Cannabidiol, only in a cannabis-derived pharmaceutical formulation marketed by GW Pharmaceuticals as Epidiolex. Other CBD formulations remain Schedule 1, except for those derived from hemp which are unscheduled but still FDA-regulated.

Controlled by other federal laws for legal recreational use
These psychoactive drugs are not controlled by the act, and are also allowed for sale intended for recreational use at the federal level (others are allowed for sale as dietary supplements, but not specifically regulated or intended for recreational use):
Alcohol (ethanol), a sedative found in alcoholic drinks. Per the National Minimum Drinking Age Act (which is voluntarily abided by all 50 U.S. states), sale is limited to persons 21-years-old and above only. Sale regulated by the Bureau of Alcohol, Tobacco, Firearms and Explosives (ATF) and less commonly the Food and Drug Administration (FDA). Alcohol was formerly illegal under the Eighteenth Amendment to the Constitution from 1919, until the Twenty-first Amendment repealed it in 1933.
Caffeine, a stimulant found in coffee, chocolate; and some teas and soft drinks. It is regulated by the FDA under the Federal Food, Drug, and Cosmetic Act, and drinks cannot contain more than 200 parts per million (0.02%) of caffeine. There is no federal age restriction for caffeine-containing products. Also available medically in some pain medications (usually in combination with other drugs, like in aspirin/acetaminophen/caffeine).
Nicotine, a stimulant found in tobacco (including cigarettes and cigars) and electronic cigarettes. Also used medically in nicotine replacement therapy. The minimum purchasing age of tobacco and e-cigarettes in the whole United States is 21-years-old, per the Federal Food, Drug, and Cosmetic Act. Sale regulated by the ATF and FDA.

Regulation of precursors

The Controlled Substances Act also provides for federal regulation of precursors used to manufacture some of the controlled substances.  The DEA list of chemicals is actually modified when the United States Attorney General determines that illegal manufacturing processes have changed.

In addition to the CSA, due to pseudoephedrine (PSE) and ephedrine being widely used in the manufacture of methamphetamine, the U.S. Congress passed the Methamphetamine Precursor Control Act which places restrictions on the sale of any medicine containing pseudoephedrine. That bill was then superseded by the Combat Methamphetamine Epidemic Act of 2005, which was passed as an amendment to the Patriot Act renewal and included wider and more comprehensive restrictions on the sale of PSE-containing products. This law requires customer signature of a "log-book" and presentation of valid photo ID in order to purchase PSE-containing products from all retailers.

Additionally, the law restricts an individual to the retail purchase of no more than three packages or 3.6 grams of such product per day per purchase – and no more than 9 grams in a single month.  A violation of this statute constitutes a misdemeanor. Retailers now commonly require PSE-containing products to be sold behind the pharmacy or service counter. This affects many preparations which were previously available over-the-counter without restriction, such as Actifed and its generic equivalents.

Research Exemptions 
A common misunderstanding amongst researchers is that most national laws (including the Controlled Substance Act) allows the supply/use of small amounts of a controlled substance for non-clinical / non-in vivo research without licences. A typical use case might be having a few milligrams or microlitres of a controlled substance within larger chemical collections (often 10K’s of chemicals) for in vitro screening or sale. Researchers often believe that there is some form of "research exemption" for such small amounts. This incorrect view may be further re-enforced by R&D chemical suppliers often stating and asking scientists to confirm that anything bought is for research use only.

A further misconception is that the Controlled Substances Act simply lists a few hundred substances (e.g. MDMA, Fentanyl, Amphetamine, etc.) and compliance can be achieved via checking a CAS number, chemical name or similar identifier. However, the reality is that in most cases all ethers, esters, salts and stereo isomers are also controlled and it is impossible to simply list all of these. The act contains several "generic statements" or "chemical space" laws, which aim to control all chemicals similar to the "named" substance, these provide detailed descriptions similar to Markushes, these include ones for Fentanyl and also synthetic cannabinoids. 

Due to this complexity in legislation the identification of controlled chemicals in research or chemical supply is often carried out computationally on the chemical structure, either by in house systems maintained a company or by the use commercial software solutions. Automated systems are often required as many research operations can have chemical collections running into 10Ks of molecules at the 1–5 mg scale, which are likely to include controlled substances, especially within medicinal chemistry research, even if the core research of the company is not narcotic or psychotropic drugs. These may not have been controlled when created, but they have subsequently been declared controlled, or fall within chemical space close to known controlled substances, or are used as tool compounds, precursors or sythetic intermediates.

Analogues vs Markush descriptions 
Historically, in an attempt to prevent psychoactive chemicals which are chemically similar to controlled substance, but not specifically controlled by it, the CSA also controls "analogues" of many listed controlled substances. The definition of what 'analogue' means is kept deliberately vague, presumably to make it harder to circumvent this rule, as it's not clear what is / is not controlled, thus placing an element of risk and deterrent in those performing the supply.  It is upto the courts to then decide whether a specific chemical is an analogue, often via a 'battle of experts' for the defense and prosecution which can lead to extended and more uncertain prosecutions.  The use of the  'analogue' definition also make it more difficult for companies involved in the legitimate supply of chemicals for research and industrial purposes to know whether a chemical is regulated under the CSA

Starting in 2012, with the Synthetic drug abuse prevention act, and later an amendment to the CSA in 2018 defining fentanyl chemical space, the CSA started to use Markush descriptions to clearly define what analogues or chemical space is controlled. These chemical space, chemical family, generic statements or markush statements (depending on the legislation terminology) have widely been used for many year's by other countries, notably the UK in the Misuse of Drugs Act.  

These have the advantage of clearly defining what is controlled, making prosecutions easier and compliance by legitimate companies simpler. However the downside is that these tend to be harder to understand for non-chemists and also give those wishing to supply for illegitimate reasons something to 'aim' for in terms of non-controlled chemical space.  For both Markush and analogue type approaches, typically computational systems are used to flag likely regulated chemicals.

Criticism

The CSA does not include a definition of "drug abuse". In addition, research shows certain substances on Schedule I, for drugs which have no accepted medical uses and high potential for abuse, actually have accepted medical uses, have low potential for abuse, or both. One of those substances is cannabis, which is either decriminalized or legalized in 33 states of the United States.

See also

Similar legislation outside of the United States:
 Controlled Drugs and Substances Act (Canada)
 Misuse of Drugs Act 1971 (United Kingdom)

Notes

References

External links
 Full text of Controlled Substances Act: 1970 version | Current version
 Controlled Substances Act (PDF/details) as amended in the GPO Statute Compilations collection
 The Controlled Substances Act (CSA): A Legal Overview for the 116th Congress

 
Drug Enforcement Administration
History of drug control
1970 in American politics
United States federal criminal legislation
1970 in cannabis
Cannabis law in the United States